Butterfield Township is a civil township of Missaukee County in the U.S. state of Michigan.  As of the 2010 census, the township population was 489.

Communities
It is approximately three and a half miles south of Merritt on County Road 565 and the eastern terminus of County Road 584. A rural post office operated from October 30, 1895 until October 31, 1922. 
 Edson Corners  was a community and former post office in the township on the Muskegon River. It was named for Edson Witherell. The post office operated from August 21, 1878, until March 15, 1900. 
 The community of Falmouth is to the southwest, and the Falmouth post office with ZIP code 49632 also serves the southern portion Butterfield Township.

Geography

The Muskegon River flows through the township.

Highways
 forms the entire northern boundary of the township.
 was a former state highway that existed from 1919 to 1939.

Demographics
As of the census of 2000, there were 548 people, 211 households, and 155 families residing in the township.  The population density was 15.3 per square mile (5.9/km2).  There were 388 housing units at an average density of 10.8 per square mile (4.2/km2).  The racial makeup of the township was 97.63% White, 0.18% African American, 0.55% Native American, 0.18% Asian, and 1.46% from two or more races. Hispanic or Latino of any race were 0.18% of the population.

There were 211 households, out of which 31.3% had children under the age of 18 living with them, 59.7% were married couples living together, 10.4% had a female householder with no husband present, and 26.5% were non-families. 21.8% of all households were made up of individuals, and 8.1% had someone living alone who was 65 years of age or older.  The average household size was 2.60 and the average family size was 2.97.

In the township the population was spread out, with 25.2% under the age of 18, 7.8% from 18 to 24, 27.7% from 25 to 44, 25.9% from 45 to 64, and 13.3% who were 65 years of age or older.  The median age was 40 years. For every 100 females, there were 98.6 males.  For every 100 females age 18 and over, there were 101.0 males.

The median income for a household in the township was $37,188, and the median income for a family was $40,357. Males had a median income of $27,375 versus $21,250 for females. The per capita income for the township was $16,993.  About 7.1% of families and 8.8% of the population were below the poverty line, including 13.8% of those under age 18 and 7.0% of those age 65 or over.

Notes

Townships in Missaukee County, Michigan
Townships in Michigan